United States v. Hartwell, 73 U.S. 385 (1867), was a decision of the United States Supreme Court which defined the characteristics of an Officer of the United States. An Officer, as opposed to a mere government employee, has a tenure, duration, emolument, and duties defined by law as opposed by contract.

References

External links 
 

1867 in United States case law
United States Supreme Court cases
United States Supreme Court cases of the Chase Court
Appointments Clause case law
United States separation of powers case law